The 1982 Trans America Athletic Conference men's basketball tournament (now known as the ASUN men's basketball tournament) was held March 3–5 at the Fant–Ewing Coliseum in Monroe, Louisiana.

 defeated  in the championship game, 98–85, to win their second TAAC/Atlantic Sun men's basketball tournament. The Indians, in turn, received an automatic bid to the 1982 NCAA tournament.

Only the top seven teams in the conference qualified for this year's tournament; the two teams with the worst records, Samford and Hardin–Simmons, were excluded.

Bracket

References

ASUN men's basketball tournament
Tournament
TAAC men's basketball tournament
TAAC men's basketball tournament